The Polar Express is an action-adventure platform game based on the film of the same name. It was developed by Blue Tongue Entertainment for the PlayStation 2, GameCube and Microsoft Windows. A version for the Game Boy Advance was developed by Tantalus Media. All versions of the game were published by THQ. It was released in North America on November 2, 2004 and in Europe on December 16, 2004.

Gameplay 
The game follows most of the main plot of the film. One major difference is that the Ebenezer Scrooge Puppet, who only makes a minor appearance in the film, plays a much bigger role as the main antagonist who attempts to prevent the children from believing in Santa Claus by stealing their tickets, and trying to get them thrown off the train to keep the children from getting to the North Pole. The game is broken down into six chapters, giving the player the opportunity to explore areas like the train, the North Pole, and more. The player controls a young boy in each of the 6 chapters. The game also contains puzzle-solving as well as some minigame-styled elements.

Development 
THQ unveiled the game at the E3 convention in 2004. The PlayStation 2 version contains EyeToy support. A portable version of the game was also in development for the Game Boy Advance, by developer Tantalus.

Reception 

The Polar Express received "generally unfavorable" reviews according to video game review aggregator Metacritic.

References

External links 
 
 

2004 video games
Game Boy Advance games
Windows games
GameCube games
PlayStation 2 games
Action-adventure games
THQ games
Video games based on films
Video games based on adaptations
Video games developed in Australia
Video games set in Michigan
Video games set in Canada
Video games set in the Arctic
Single-player video games
Tantalus Media games
Blue Tongue Entertainment games